Turku Repair Yard Ltd is a Finnish ship repair company. Its premises are situated in Luonnonmaa island, Naantali. The company has focused on repairing of ships and boats.

Turku Repair Yard is a part of Estonian BLRT Grupp.

Premises 
The company's premises are situated in Naantali, Finland. The maximum crane capacity is 150 tonnes.

History 
The company origins date back to Turku shipbuilding company Crichton-Vulcan and its predecessors. Ships were traditionally hoisted up by using slipways. In 1933, in the middle of the Great Depression, the city of Turku started building a large dry dock next to Korppolaismäki with employment subsidies. The quarry work began in 1934 and the new facility opened in August 1937. The dock was given to be operated by Crichton-Vulcan and the first docking took place in February 1939.

Wärtsilä took over Crichton-Vulcan at the end of the 1930s and in the 1960s the yard was renamed Wärtsilä Turku Shipyard. In the 1970s Wärtsilä built an entirely new yard in Perno. The Wärtsilä shipyards in Turku were reorganised in 1984. New ships were now built only at Perno yard and the old yard by the Aura River focused entirely on ship repairs. Following the bankruptcy of Wärtsilä Marine in 1989, a new company, Turku Repair Yard Ltd, was established the same year to continue ship repair operations. In 2003 the company left the premises at the Aura River and concentrated its operations in Naantali. The history of the Naantali premises dates back to 1956, when Rainer Sjöström founded shipping and shipbuilding subcontractor Navire Oy. In 1972 the company built in Luonnonmaa island a dry dock for hull building. Navire was split up in 1981 due to financial difficulties.

The company was taken over by Estonian BLRT Grupp in 2007.

In 2017 the company announced seeking to develop ship breaking as a new line of business.

Sources

References 

Finnish companies established in 1989
Manufacturing companies of Finland